Marinus Cornelius Piepers (1836 – 1919 in The Hague) was a Dutch entomologist.

He specialised in Lepidoptera and Coleoptera especially of the Dutch East Indies. His collection is conserved in Naturalis in Leiden.

Works
The Rhopalocera of Java. with Pieter Cornelius Tobias Snellen and Hans Fruhstorfer. The Hague,M. Nijhoff 1909-18.
online at Biodiversity Heritage Library Four volumes.

External links
Gaedicke in Groll, E. K. (Hrsg.): Biografien der Entomologen der Welt : Datenbank. Version 4.15 : Senckenberg Deutsches Entomologisches Institut, 2010.

1836 births
1919 deaths
Dutch lepidopterists